The Finnish Hockey Hall of Fame is housed in and administered by the  ('Finnish Ice Hockey Museum'), a part of the Vapriikki Museum Centre, in Tampere, Finland. The mission of the Finnish Hockey Hall of Fame is to record, document, and exhibit objects, photographs, and printed materials related to Finnish ice hockey. The original Kanada-malja and the Aurora Borealis Cup are on display along with a number of active-use Liiga awards and hockey memorabilia including sweaters and game-used gear from past seasons.

When the hall of fame was established on June 14, 1979, its founding members included Aarne Honkavaara, Kalervo Kummola, Kimmo Leinonen, Harry Lindblad, and others. Notable chairpersons of the hall of fame have included, Harry Lindblad (1979–1983), Aarne Honkavaara (1983–1996), Unto Wiitala (1996–2001), and Kimmo Leinonen (2011–2018).

Each Jääkiekkoleijona is designated with the chronological number of their induction. Including the induction class of 2022, there are 268 inductees in the Hockey Hall of Fame Finland. Of the 268 inductees, thirteen are women.

Inductees

See also
Finnish Ice Hockey Association
Ice hockey in Finland
IIHF Hall of Fame
Hockey Hall of Fame

References

External links
 

Ice hockey museums and halls of fame
Hall
Halls of fame in Finland
1979 establishments in Finland
Awards established in 1985
Sport in Tampere